The Flag of Malacca is the flag of the Malaysian state of Malacca. Red, white, yellow and blue, which are the colours of the flag of Malaysia, are also used in the flag of Malacca to emphasize that Malacca is a member state of Malaysia. The star and crescent represents Islam, the official religion of the State and of the nation. The top left hand quarter has a background of royal blue with a yellow crescent moon and a yellow five-pointed star. The top right hand quarter is red and the lower half is white.

Historical flags

City, district and municipal flags

References

External links
Malacca State Flag in Malay
Malacca State Flag in English

Malacca
Malacca